Shadows is a 1916 American short film directed by  B. Reeves Eason.

Cast
 Frank Mayo
 Philo McCullough
 Harry Southard
 Lillian West

External links

1916 films
1916 short films
American silent short films
American black-and-white films
Films directed by B. Reeves Eason
1910s American films